Hotel Stein is the oldest hotel in Salzburg, Austria founded in 1399.

In 2001 the businessman Haythem Al Wazzan bought the hotel and made the complete renovation. Salzburg architects Michael Strobl and Christian Prasser planned the general renovation made in 2016 and in 2017 the hotel reopened as a 4-star one.

See also 
List of oldest companies

References

External links 
Homepage
Location on Google Maps

Hotels in Austria
Restaurants in Austria
Companies established in the 14th century
14th-century establishments in Austria
Buildings and structures in Salzburg
Economy of Salzburg (state)
Hotels established in the 14th century